Main Street Grammar School, also known as Union High School, is a historic school building located at Union, Union County, South Carolina.  It was built in 1909, and is a two-story, brick Neo-Classical building. It features a brick parapet, central projecting bay and large pedimented portico. In 1965, the Union Campus of the University of South Carolina acquired the building and rehabilitated it to serve as its main campus building.

It was added to the National Register of Historic Places in 1989.  It is located in the East Main Street-Douglass Heights Historic District.

References

School buildings on the National Register of Historic Places in South Carolina
Neoclassical architecture in South Carolina
School buildings completed in 1909
Buildings and structures in Union County, South Carolina
National Register of Historic Places in Union County, South Carolina
Historic district contributing properties in South Carolina
1909 establishments in South Carolina